Lajos Mocsai (born 10 March 1954) is a former Hungarian international handball player, coach, university professor and sports director.

Mocsai worked as the head coach of MKB Veszprém KC since his appointment in 2007, and beside his club team duties, he also served as the technical director of the Hungarian men's national team from February 2010, before taking over the head coach position from István Csoknyai. In the summer of 2012 Mocsai resigned from the coaching position of Veszprém to fully concentrate on his work by the national team.

Career
One of the most successful managers in Europe, Mocsai has won several continental club competition trophies, led the Hungarian women's national team to European Championship title and won silver both on the World Championship and the Olympic Games with the same team. In addition, he also captured a World Championship silver with the Hungarian men's national team in 1986.

Two of the players who were trained by him, namely Daniel Stephan and Bojana Radulovics were given the IHF World Player of the Year award.

Mocsai also has been honoured many times, from which the most valuable is probably the Life Achievement Award, which he received on the ten years jubilee of the European Handball Federation in 2002. The prestigious prize is adjudged by strict criteria and was awarded only to four coaches in Europe.

In 2011 TBV Lemgo celebrated its 100th anniversary and on this occasion the club honoured the greatest individuals who served the club. Mocsai was given the Head Coach of the Century (Jahrhunderttrainer) title for his hard to work with that he built up professional handball in Lemgo.

Personal
He is married. He has four children: three daughters and a son. One of the daughters, Dorottya, and his son Tamás are both professional handball players.

Coaching achievements

Club
Nemzeti Bajokság I – women:
Winner: 1982
Magyar Kupa – women:
Winner: 1982
Nemzeti Bajokság I – men:
Winner: 1983, 2008, 2009, 2010, 2011, 2012
Magyar Kupa – men:
Winner: 1983, 2009, 2010, 2011, 2012
DHB-Pokal – men:
Winner: 1995
EHF Champions League – women:
Winner: 1982
EHF Cup Winners' Cup – men:
Winner: 1996, 2008
EHF Cup – men:
Winner: 1998

National team
Olympic Games – women's tournament:
Silver Medalist: 2000
Fifth Placed: 2004
Olympic Games – men's tournament:
Fourth Placed: 1988
Fourth Placed: 2012
World Championship – women's tournament:
Silver Medalist: 2003
Fifth Placed: 1999
Sixth Placed: 2001
World Championship – men's tournament:
Silver Medalist: 1986
European Championship – women's tournament:
Winner: 2000
Bronze Medalist: 1998
Fifth Placed: 2002

Individual awards and recognitions
 Knight's Cross of the Order of Merit of the Republic of Hungary (2000)
 Lifetime Achievement Award of the European Handball Federation (2002)
 Endre Kerezsi Award (2003)
 Hungarian Coach of the Year (2009)
 Fair Play Award for the propagation of sportsmanship – Hungarian Olympic Committee (2011)
 Head Coach of the Century of TBV Lemgo (2011)
 Hungarian Handball Coach of the Year (2012)

References

1954 births
Living people
Sportspeople from Szeged
Hungarian male handball players
Hungarian handball coaches
Hungarian referees and umpires
Handball coaches of international teams
Hungarian expatriate sportspeople in Germany
Knight's Crosses of the Order of Merit of the Republic of Hungary (civil)